Club 82, also known as the 82 Club, was a nightclub in Manhattan, New York City that employed female impersonators as entertainers. The nightclub had a second life as a music venue, but was eventually closed.

History

Predecessors 
The 181 Club was a predecessor to Club 82, and was named for its address at 181 Second Avenue. The club operated from 1945 to 1953, featuring male impersonators as waitstaff, and female impersonators as entertainers. The 181 Club lost its liquor license after being labelled a "hangout for perverts of both sexes".

Founding 
Club 82 was connected to the Genovese crime family and the Costello crime syndicate. While mobster Vito Genovese was in hiding abroad, his wife Anna Genovese became hostess of Club 82. The club's tagline was "Who's No Lady," and its drag revues featured both male and female impersonators.

Kitt Russell, dubbed “America’s top femme mimic” by Walter Winchell, hosted many of the shows, and countless acts performed in them, such as female impersonators Sonne Teal, Kim Christy, and Mel Michaels.  Revues were long and elaborate, replete with sets and costumes, and with titles like Sincapades of 1954, A Vacation in Color, Fun-Fair for '57, and Time Out for Fun.

Investigation 
In 1953, Club 82 came under police investigation with a potential loss of its liquor license, allegedly orchestrated by vindictive Vito to spite Anna. In testifying against her own clubs, Anna stated that the Club 82 was gang-owned. Her testimony ostensibly served to shift the blame from solely herself to her husband Vito's associates who had presided over, and allegedly monitored her activities running the club, while Vito was in exile in Italy.

The State Liquor Authority had previously revoked Club 82's liquor license on account of "disorderly conduct," which was code at the time for infractions involving things like serving alcohol to gay people, or people suspected of being gay.

Culture 
Although the entertainers were mostly gay, Club 82 catered primarily to heterosexuals.

Entertainers were reportedly overworked, and the club was frequented by wealthy celebrities:

See also 
 Club My-O-My – New Orleans nightclub with female impersonators.
 Finocchio's Club – San Francisco nightclub with female impersonators.

References

External links 
 New York Historical Society: Welcome to 82 Club: The Naughty Story of a Legendary New York Drag Institution
 NYC LGBT Historic Sites Project: Club 82

Culture of Manhattan
Defunct LGBT drinking establishments in New York City
Defunct nightclubs
History of Manhattan